Silver Lake is an unincorporated community and census-designated place (CDP) in Essex County, New Jersey, United States, that is split between Belleville (with 3,769 of the CDP's residents) and Bloomfield (474 of the total). As of the 2010 United States Census, the CDP's total population was 4,243.

Geography
According to the United States Census Bureau, Silver Lake had a total area of 0.326 square miles (0.845 km2), all of which was land.

Demographics

Census 2010

References

Belleville, New Jersey
Bloomfield, New Jersey
Census-designated places in Essex County, New Jersey